The 1998 Campeonato Brasileiro Série A was the 42nd edition of the Campeonato Brasileiro Série A.

Overview
It was performed by 24 teams, and Corinthians won the championship.

First phase

Quarterfinals

Semifinals

Finals

First leg

Second leg

Replay

Final standings

Top scorers

References

1
1998
Brazil